The 2023 World Wheelchair Mixed Doubles Curling Championship was held from March 4 to 12 at the Richmond Curling Centre in Richmond, British Columbia, Canada. The event was held in conjunction with the 2023 World Wheelchair Curling Championship.

Teams
The teams are listed as follows:

Round robin standings
Final Round Robin Standings

Round robin results
All draws times are listed in Pacific Time (UTC−08:00).

Draw 1
Saturday, March 4, 9:00 am

Draw 2
Saturday, March 4, 4:00 pm

Draw 3
Sunday, March 5, 9:00 am

Draw 4
Sunday, March 5, 4:00 pm

Draw 5
Monday, March 6, 9:00 am

Draw 6
Monday, March 6, 4:30 pm

Draw 7
Tuesday, March 7, 9:00 am

Draw 8
Tuesday, March 7, 4:30 pm

Draw 9
Wednesday, March 8, 9:00 am

Draw 10
Wednesday, March 8, 4:30 pm

Draw 11
Thursday, March 9, 9:00 am

Draw 12
Thursday, March 9, 6:00 pm

Draw 13
Friday, March 10, 9:00 am

Draw 14
Friday, March 10, 7:00 pm

Playoffs

Qualification Games
Saturday, March 11, 9:00 am

Semifinals
Saturday, March 11, 7:00 pm

Bronze medal game
Sunday, March 12, 2:30 pm

Final
Sunday, March 12, 2:30 pm

Final standings

See also 
2023 World Wheelchair Curling Championship

References

External links

World Wheelchair Mixed Doubles Curling Championship
World Wheelchair Mixed Doubles Curling Championship
World Wheelchair Mixed Doubles Curling Championship
World Wheelchair Mixed Doubles Curling Championship
World Wheelchair Mixed Doubles Curling Championship